Broadwater Parklands light rail station is located on Queen Street in the Gold Coast suburb of Southport. The station is part of the Gold Coast G:link light rail system and provides direct access to Southport Broadwater Parklands, a large community park situated on the Gold Coast Broadwater.

Location 
Below is a map of the local area. The station can be identified by the grey marker.{
  "type": "FeatureCollection",
  "features": [
    {
      "type": "Feature",
      "properties": {},
      "geometry": {
        "type": "Point",
        "coordinates": [
          153.4187889110763,
          -27.97349487345333
        ]
      }
    }
  ]
}

External links 
 G:link

References 

G:link stations
Railway stations in Australia opened in 2014
Southport, Queensland